10 Years Younger in 10 Days is a reality make-over show that screens on the Seven Network in Australia. The series is presented by Sonia Kruger and is based on the British series 10 Years Younger.

With the help of experts the participants of the show are given a complete make over in an attempt to make them look 10 Years Younger in 10 Days. At the start of the program the person's age is guessed by people on the street and an average is taken. From this average the target image is set. At the end of the show this happens again to see the results.

The show premiered on 21 April 2009 and rated 1,348,000 viewers and came in fifth position for the night, a particularly strong result given its 9:30pm timeslot.

Experts
Sonia Kruger – Host
Will Fennell – Grooming
Troy Thompson – Hair Stylist
Jane Johnston – Stylist
Julianne McGuigan – Hair Stylist
Cathy Savage – Beauty and Make-Up
Ken Thompson – Stylist
Dr Warwick Nettle – Health Professional/Plastic Surgeon
Dr Fadi Yassmin – Health Professional/Cosmetic Dentistry
Dr David Carr – Health Professional/Cosmetic Dentistry
Andreas Lundin – Health Professional/Personal Trainer

See also
10 Years Younger (UK) UK version on Channel 4
10 Years Younger (US) US version on the TLC network.

References

External links
 Official website http://au.tv.yahoo.com/10-years-younger-in-10-days
 Cornerbox Productions http://cornerbox.com.au/

Seven Network original programming
2000s Australian reality television series
2009 Australian television series debuts